DDPP is the Deep Decarbonization Pathways Project, a global consortium.

DDPP may also refer to:

 Double deck push-pull, a train carriage type; see Israel Railways
 Deputy Directors of Public Prosecutions, of the Prosecutions Division, Hong Kong
 Digital Diabetes Prevention Programme, of NHS England; see Rune Bech